Ezequiel Castillo may refer to:
Ezequiel Castillo (footballer) (born 1967), Argentine retired footballer
Ezequiel Castillo (beach volleyball), beach volleyball player from Dominican Republic